Zuxul (also, Tsukhul’ and Zukhul) is a village and municipality in the Qusar Rayon of Azerbaijan on the Azerbaijan–Russia border. It has a population of 372.

References 

Populated places in Qusar District